Kratié Municipality is a municipality (krong) located in Kratié province, in Cambodia.

Administration
The district is subdivided into 5 communes (khum).

References 

Districts of Kratié province